is a Japanese badminton player from the NTT East team. Born in Miyagi, he graduated from the Saitama Sakae high school, and later educated at the Nippon Sport Science University. He was part of the national junior team that won the bronze medal at the 2007 Asian Junior Championships. Teamed-up with Naomasa Senkyo, they won the men's doubles title at the North Shore City and Waikato International tournaments. Sato also clinched the men's singles title at the 2014 Portugal International tournament.

Achievements

BWF International Challenge/Series 
Men's singles

Men's doubles

  BWF International Challenge tournament
  BWF International Series tournament
  BWF Future Series tournament

References

External links 
 

Living people
1990 births
Sportspeople from Miyagi Prefecture
Japanese male badminton players
21st-century Japanese people